Brane is a hamlet southwest of Sancreed in west Cornwall, England, UK. It is in the civil parish of Sancreed.  It is noted for the Carn Euny Iron Age site which lies to the north. Other prehistoric sites nearby include the Iron-Age hill fort of Caer Bran, and chambered tomb known as Brane Barrow.

References

Hamlets in Cornwall
Penwith